Serhiy Volodymyrovych Kunitsyn is a Ukrainian politician from Crimea, and former veteran of the Soviet–Afghan War.

Since December 2014 Kunitsyn is a member of the Ukrainian parliament as an independent politician for Petro Poroshenko Bloc.

Biography
He was born on 27 July 1960 in the town of Bekdash, on the Caspian coast in the Turkmen SSR, in the Soviet Union. In 1982 Kunitsyn graduated as a construction engineer-technologist from the Dnipropetrovsk Construction Engineering Institute in Simferopol. After the institute he worked for "Perekop Chemical Construction" (Krasnoperekopsk) followed by the obligatory service in the army and serving over a year in Afghanistan.

After the army, for a short period in 1985 Kunitsyn worked as an engineer-technologist at "Crimea Canal Construction" followed by the appointment as a chief engineer at the Krasnoperekopsk Plant of reinforced concrete where he worked until 1989. In 1989–1990 he worked as an instructor at the ideological department of the Krasnoperekopsk city committee of the Communist Party of Ukraine. In March 1990 Kunitsyn was elected as the People's Deputy of Ukraine and in April of the same year as a mayor of Krasnoperekopsk serving at that post until 1998. During that time he also headed the Party Union in support of Crimea Republic.

In 1995–2001 Kunitsyn served as a head of administration of the North Crimean experimental economic zone "Syvash". From 27 May 1998 to 24 July 2001 and from April 2002 to April 2005 he was placing the Chairman of the Council of Ministers of Crimea. From July 2001 to April 2002 he was an advisor to President Leonid Kuchma. Since February 2004 Kunitsyn has headed the Crimean regional organization of the Ukrainian society of Afghanistan veterans. From June 2006 to April 2010 he was the Chairman of Sevastopol City State Administration appointed by the President of Ukraine.

In 2008, as a Chairman of Sevastopol City State Administration, Kunitsyn joined the political party United Centre. In 2012 Kunitsyn was reelected to the Verkhovna Rada (Ukrainian parliament) as a member of the UDAR party.

On 27 February 2014 a decree of the acting President, Oleksandr Turchynov, appointed him Permanent Representative of the President in Crimea. On 24 March 2014 Kunitsyn said that "because of the toothless government" he had decided to resign from this post and on 26 March Turchinov signed a decree to dismiss him with the phrase "for the improper performance of official duties."

President Petro Poroshenko appointed Kunitsyn as his adviser on 25 June 2014.

Since December 2014 Kunitsyn is a member of the Ukrainian parliament as an independent politician for Petro Poroshenko Bloc, he was number 68 of the national party list of this political party in the 2014 Ukrainian parliamentary election.

Personal life 
Sehiy Kunitsyn has married in 1982. He has two children daughter Natalia (1986) and son Oleksiy (1991).

See also
 Electoral Bloc of Kunitsyn

References

External links
 Verkhovna Rada website
 Opened Ukraine
 UDAR member refused the award

1960 births
Living people
People from Garabogaz
Turkmenistan emigrants to Ukraine
Governors of Sevastopol (Ukraine)
Prime Ministers of Crimea
Independent politicians of Petro Poroshenko Bloc
Ukrainian Democratic Alliance for Reform politicians
United Centre politicians
Communist Party of Ukraine (Soviet Union) politicians
Soviet military personnel of the Soviet–Afghan War
First convocation members of the Verkhovna Rada
Seventh convocation members of the Verkhovna Rada
Eighth convocation members of the Verkhovna Rada
People of the annexation of Crimea by the Russian Federation
Ukrainian football chairmen and investors
SC Tavriya Simferopol
Presidential representatives of Ukraine in Crimea
Ukrainian exiles of the annexation of Crimea by the Russian Federation
Recipients of the Order of Prince Yaroslav the Wise, 4th class
Laureates of the State Prize of Ukraine in Science and Technology
Recipients of the Honorary Diploma of the Cabinet of Ministers of Ukraine